Tazehnab-e Mohammad Baqer (also Romanized as Tāzehnāb-e Moḩammad Bāqer; also known as Pīr Ḩayāmī and Pīr Ḩayātī) is a village in Shaban Rural District, in the Central District of Nahavand County, Hamadan Province, Iran. At the 2006 census, its population was 18, in 4 families.

References 

Populated places in Nahavand County